Reza Ghanizadeh (born 24 February 1979), is an Iranian football defender who last played for DAC 1904 Dunajská Streda.

External links

DAC 1904 profile 
Eurofotbal profile

References

1982 births
Living people
Iranian footballers
Association football defenders
FC DAC 1904 Dunajská Streda players
Sanat Mes Kerman F.C. players
Paykan F.C. players
Gostaresh Foulad F.C. players
Slovak Super Liga players
Iranian expatriate footballers
Expatriate footballers in Slovakia
Iranian expatriate sportspeople in Slovakia